is a 2009 Japanese film directed by Isshin Inudō. It was nominated for Best Film at the 33rd Japan Academy Prize. It is a remake of the 1961 film by the same name.

Awards and nominations
33rd Japan Academy Prize.
Nominated: Best Film
Nominated: Best Director - Isshin Inudō
Nominated: Best Actress - Ryōko Hirosue

See also
Zero Focus

References

External links

2009 films
Japanese drama films
2000s Japanese-language films
Films directed by Isshin Inudo
Films set in Ishikawa Prefecture
2000s Japanese films

ja:ゼロの焦点#2009年